Tirabad is a village in Powys, Wales, not to be confused with a place of the same name in Iran. The name means "the abbot's land"; the village belonged to Strata Florida abbey in the Middle Ages. Many people had to leave the village during World War II as the military used the area for artillery training, but the village expanded substantially in the 1950s, when the Forestry Commission, now defunct, began tree plantations and built about 25 houses, a school, a village hall and a shop for their employees.

St. David's Church, built in 1726, is the only Georgian church in Breconshire. No services are currently held at the church due to structural problems with the building, although work is underway to enable it to be reopened.

Just outside the village is the Tirabad Centre, an outdoor pursuits centre run by the Tirabad Residential Educational Trust and owned jointly by outsiders, three state schools in Berkshire, England - Charters in Sunningdale, The Emmbrook near Wokingham and Maiden Erlegh in Earley. The Centre was closed in March 2021 and its assets taken over by liquidators.

References

External links
Tirabad Centre
Photos of Tirabad and surrounding area on geograph

Villages in Powys